The Taxil hoax was an 1890s hoax of exposure by Léo Taxil intended to mock not only Freemasonry but also the Catholic Church's opposition to it.

Taxil and Freemasonry
Léo Taxil was the pen name of Marie Joseph Gabriel Antoine Jogand-Pagès, who had been accused earlier of libel regarding a book he wrote called The Secret Loves of Pope Pius IX. On April 20, 1884, Pope Leo XIII published an encyclical, Humanum genus, that said that the human race was:

After this encyclical, Taxil underwent a public, feigned conversion to Roman Catholicism and announced his intention of repairing the damage he had done to the true faith.

The first book produced by Taxil after his conversion was a four-volume history of Freemasonry, which contained fictitious eyewitness verifications of their participation in Satanism. With a collaborator who published as "Dr. Karl Hacks", Taxil wrote another book called Le Diable au XIXe siècle (The Devil in the Nineteenth Century), which introduced a new character, Diana Vaughan, a supposed descendant of the Rosicrucian alchemist Thomas Vaughan. The book contained many tales about her encounters with incarnate demons, one of whom was supposed to have written prophecies on her back with its tail, and another who played the piano while in the shape of a crocodile.

Diana was supposedly involved in Satanic Freemasonry but was redeemed when one day she professed admiration for Joan of Arc, at whose name the demons were put to flight. As Diana Vaughan, Taxil published a book called Eucharistic Novena, a collection of prayers which were praised by the Pope.

Palladists
In the Taxil hoax, Palladists were members of an alleged Theistic Satanist cult within Freemasonry. According to Taxil, Palladism was a religion practiced within the highest orders of Freemasonry. Adherents worshipped Lucifer and interacted with demons. 

In 1891 Léo Taxil (Gabriel Jogand-Pagès) and Adolphe Ricoux claimed to have discovered a Palladian Society. An 1892 French book Le Diable au XIXe siècle (The Devil in the 19th Century", 1892), written by "Dr. Bataille" (actually Jogand-Pagès himself) alleged that Palladists were Satanists based in Charleston, South Carolina, headed by the American Freemason Albert Pike and created by the Italian liberal patriot and author Giuseppe Mazzini.

Arthur Edward Waite, debunking the existence of the group in Devil-Worship in France, or The Question of Lucifer, ch. II: "The Mask of Masonry" (London, 1896), reports according to "the works of Domenico Margiotta and Dr Bataille" that "[t]he Order of Palladium founded in Paris 20 May 1737 or Sovereign  Council of Wisdom" was a "Masonic diabolic order".  Dr. Bataille asserted that women would supposedly be initiated as "Companions of Penelope". According to Dr. Bataille, the society had two orders, "Adelph" and "Companion of Ulysses"; however, the society was broken up by French law enforcement a few years after its founding. A supposed Diana Vaughan published Confessions of an Ex-Palladist in 1895.

Confession
On April 19, 1897, Léo Taxil called a press conference at which, he claimed, he would introduce Diana Vaughan to the press. At the conference instead he announced that his revelations about the Freemasons were fictitious. He thanked the Catholic clergy for their assistance in giving publicity to his wild claims.

Taxil's confession was printed, in its entirety, in the Parisian newspaper Le Frondeur, on April 25, 1897, titled: Twelve Years Under the Banner of the Church, The Prank Of Palladism. Miss Diana Vaughan–The Devil At The Freemasons. A Conference held by M. Léo Taxil, at the Hall of the Geographic Society in Paris.

The hoax material is still cited to this day. The Chick Publications tract, The Curse of Baphomet, and Randy Noblitt's book on satanic ritual abuse, Cult and Ritual Abuse, both cite Taxil's fictitious claims.

A later interview with Taxil

In the magazine National Magazine, an Illustrated American Monthly, Volume XXIV: April – September, 1906, pages 228 and 229, Taxil is quoted as giving his true reasons behind the hoax. Ten months later, on March 31, 1907, Taxil died.

The Luciferian quote
A series of paragraphs about Lucifer are frequently associated with the Taxil hoax. They read:

While this quotation was published by Abel Clarin de la Rive in his Woman and Child in Universal Freemasonry, it does not appear in Taxil's writings proper, though it is sourced in a footnote to Diana Vaughan, Taxil's creation.

Popular culture
The Palladists are the name of the Greenwich Village Satanist society in Val Lewton's film The Seventh Victim.

The Palladists play a major role in the latter part of Umberto Eco's novel The Prague Cemetery (2011).

See also

 List of hoaxes
 Affair of the Cards

References

Further reading

External links
 "A hoax", l'Illustration, May 1. 1897- No. 2827: Paris, France.
 Abel Claren de la Rive (1855-1914)
 Freemason site on the Palladium 
 Devil-Worship in France, by A.E. Waite complete e-text of Waite's debunking of Taxil.
 Lady Queenborough, Edith Starr Miller
 Leo Taxil's Confession
 The Prague Cemetery, a novel by Umberto Eco, 2010
 National Magazine, an Illustrated American Monthly, Volume XXIV: April, 1906 - September, 1906
 The Prank of Palladism Taxil's confession 
 Knights Templar page on the Palladium  

19th-century hoaxes
Catholicism and Freemasonry
Freemasonry-related controversies
Freemasonry in France
History of Freemasonry
Hoaxes in France
Satanism
April 1897 events